Spyros Natsos (born 9 June 1998) is a Greek professional footballer who plays as a right-back for Super League 2 club Panserraikos.

Career

Atromitos
On 8 February 2020, Natsos signed a contract extension with Atromitos until the summer of 2022.

Career statistics

Club

References

1998 births
Living people
Greek footballers
Greece under-21 international footballers
Greece youth international footballers
Super League Greece players
Atromitos F.C. players
Association football midfielders
Footballers from Preveza